Hugh Couchman is a Canadian astronomer and professor at McMaster University. He is a computational astrophysicist who studies the growth of structure in the universe via gravitational N-body simulations.

Early life and education 
Couchman received both his undergraduate and graduate degrees from Cambridge University. In his final year as an undergraduate, he took a course in astronomy taught by Martin Reese, which sparked his interest in cosmology. In 1986, he completed his Ph.D. from the Institute of Astronomy at Cambridge.

Career 
After finishing his PhD, Couchman moved to Canada to begin a postdoctoral fellowship at the Canadian Institute for Theoretical Astrophysics. He spent some time as an assistant professor in the department of Astronomy at the University of Toronto, before beginning a position at the department of physics and astronomy at the University of Western Ontario in 1991.

In 1999, he moved to the department of physics and astronomy at McMaster University. There he helped found SHARCNET, a consortium of universities in South Western Ontario that have joined high performance computers together by optical fiber. He is also a member of the Virgo Consortium for Cosmological Supercomputer Simulations, an international collaboration which performs state-of-the-art cosmological simulations of the large scale structure of the Universe.

Awards and recognition 

 Fellow of the CIFAR Program in Gravitation and Cosmology

Selected publications

References

External links
 Hugh Couchman's home page

20th-century  Canadian astronomers
21st-century  Canadian astronomers
Living people
Academic staff of McMaster University
Year of birth missing (living people)